These hits topped the Dutch Top 40 in 1965.

See also
1965 in music

References

1965 in the Netherlands
1965 record charts
1965